Avaí Futebol Clube Feminino, commonly known as Avaí FC Feminino, is a women's football club based in Caçador, Santa Catarina. The club was formerly known as Sociedade Esportiva Kindermann and Kindermann/Avaí. The club supplied two players (Bárbara and Andressinha) to the Brazil national team for the 2015 FIFA Women's World Cup and one player (Bárbara) for the 2019 FIFA Women's World Cup.

History
The team began in 1975 as the Sociedade Esportiva Kindermann, based in Caçador. Kindermann won all the Campeonato Catarinense Feminino between 2008 and 2015. They won the 2015 Copa do Brasil and qualified for the 2016 Copa Libertadores Femenina. However on 11 December 2015, the Kindermann's Futsal coach Josué Henrique Kaercher was shot and fatally wounded at a hotel in Caçador, due to this, the team suspended all its activities during 2016 and did not play in the 2016 Libertadores Femenina. Returning in the 2017 season, Kindermann won all the Catarinense Feminino tournaments until 2021.

On 25 February 2019, Kindermann started a partnership with Avaí, therefore between 2019 and 2021 the team was called Kindermann/Avaí. The partnership was successful and the team was third place in the 2019 Campeonato Feminino Série A1 and runners-up in 2020. Kindermann/Avaí qualified for the 2020 and 2021 Copa Libertadores Femenina being eliminated in the group stage and the quarter-finals, respectively.

As the club's president Salézio Kindermann died from the COVID-19, on 15 May 2021, the Kindermann family took control of the team until the participation in the 2021 Libertadores Femenina. After the 2021 Copa Libertadores the team was disbanded but in January 2022, Avaí assured the continuity of the team and its participation in the 2022 Série A1.

On 8 February 2022, the club was renamed to Avaí Futebol Clube Feminino. In 2023 they will leave Caçador and will moved to Florianópolis.

Players

First Team

Achievements
 Copa do Brasil de Futebol Feminino:
 Winners (1): 2015*
 :
 Winners (13): 2008*, 2009*, 2010*, 2011*, 2012*, 2013*, 2014*, 2015*, 2017*, 2018*, 2019*, 2021*, 2022

References

External links
 Official website 

Association football clubs established in 1975
1975 establishments in Brazil
Women's football clubs in Brazil